In mathematics, and especially gauge theory, the Bogomolny equation for magnetic monopoles is the equation

These equations are named after E. B. Bogomolny and were studied extensively by Michael Atiyah and Nigel Hitchin.

The equations are a dimensional reduction of the self-dual Yang–Mills equations from four dimensions to three dimensions, and correspond to global minima of the appropriate action. If  is closed, there are only trivial (i.e. flat) solutions.

See also
Monopole moduli space
Ginzburg–Landau theory
Seiberg–Witten theory
Bogomol'nyi–Prasad–Sommerfield bound

References

Differential geometry
Magnetic monopoles